This is a list of American television-related events in 1969.

Events

Television programs

Debuts

Television films and specials

Changes of network affiliation

Ending this year

Networks and services

Network launches

Television stations

Sign-ons

Network affiliation changes

Station closures

Births

Deaths

See also 
1969 in television 
1969 in film 
1969 in the United States 
List of American films of 1969

References

External links 
List of 1969 American television series at IMDb